POSCO Research Institute (POSRI) is a private research institute which provides research-based consulting services for the steel industry. POSRI conducts analysis of the current economic and managerial issues, as well as researches the forward and backward related industries to the steel industry, including energy and environment industries.

Today, POSRI works for steel industry, regional and economic study, corporate strategy and management consulting.

History
POSRI, one of the POSCO subsidiaries, was established as POSCO-MERC(Management & Engineering Research Center) within POSCO technology research institute. It was spun off from POSCO technology research institute at 1987 and consist Research Institute of Industrial Science & Technology(RIST). At 1994, it was spun off from RIST and founded as named POSCO Research Institute.

POSRI has held seminars, forums, symposiums, workshops and conferences.
Selected event
Joint Symposium: <Business Policy and Strategic Management in the Global Era: Corporate Success Factors> with Harvard University
Joint Seminar: <Technology Transfer under the WTO System> with the Rand Corporation
Joint Seminar: <APEC after the Bogor Summit: Paving the Road to Open Regionalism> with the Institute for International Economics
Business Forum: <Successful Economic Partnership> with KOTRA and Economic Times
Joint Seminar: <Key Challengers for China's Sustained Growth> with the Rand Corporation
Joint Seminar: South Korea-Mongolia Partnership (participated by Presidents and government officials)

Operations

Steel Industry Research
Research for domestic steel industry, Steel marketing and investment strategies, Research for raw material prices, forecast on price and demand-supply of raw materials, Research on the environment and sustainable management.

Regional Studies & Economic Research
Research on emerging markets, including China and India, Mornitoring economic trends and in-depth analysis on issue, Analysis on domestic and overseas policy issues and response strategies.

Corporate Strategy Research
Research on POSCO's vision and long-term strategy and Industry/Business strategy of POSCO subsidiaries, Research on energy, green growth and new business, Research on non-feerous materials .

Management Consulting
Management diagnosis, corporate governance, labor relations, labor management, human resource management and policy development, consultation on corporate innovation & change management.

Selected articles
 Jae-heon Jung,
 Byung-Wook Lee, Seung-Tae Jung, Yun-Ok Chun, 
 Kyung-Hee Jung, Sang-Kyu Lee, 
 Kyung-Hee Jung, 
 Kwang-Sook Huh, 
 Jeong-Ho Park, Yoon-gih Ahn,

References

External links

Company website (in Korean)
Company website (in English)

Research institutes in South Korea